III (Bass Communion III or Bass Communion CDR) is the name of the third studio album released by British musician, songwriter, and producer Steven Wilson under the pseudonym Bass Communion. It is a compilation of leftover pieces recorded between 1995-1999 that were not included on either of the previous two Bass Communion albums. In 2008, the album was re-issued together with II in a 2-CD edition limited to 1,200 copies.

Track listing

Track Notes 

Three Pieces for Television: appeared previously on Atmospherics

 "Sonar" appears as "Sonar"
 "Lina Romay" appears as "Night Creatures"
 "Grammatic Fog" appears as "The Fog"

Personnel 

 Steven Wilson – All instruments
 Theo Travis – Saxophone on "Reformat Spiders"

Other 

 Carl Glover - Photography
 Aleph - Graphic design

Release history

References
 

2001 albums
Bass Communion albums
Burning Shed albums